The year 2007 is the 15th year in the history of Pancrase, a mixed martial arts promotion based in Japan. In 2007 Pancrase held 17 events beginning with Pancrase: Rising 1.

Title fights

Events list

Pancrase: Rising 1

Pancrase: Rising 1 was an event held on February 4, 2007 at Korakuen Hall in Tokyo, Japan.

Results

Pancrase: Rising 2

Pancrase: Rising 2 was an event held on February 28, 2007 at Korakuen Hall in Tokyo, Japan.

Results

Pancrase: Korea Hybrid Challenge

Pancrase: Korea Hybrid Challenge was an event held on March 11, 2007 at Korakuen Hall in Tokyo, Japan.

Results

Pancrase: Rising 3

Pancrase: Rising 3 was an event held on March 18, 2007 at Korakuen Hall in Tokyo, Japan.

Results

Pancrase: 2007 Neo-Blood Tournament Eliminations

Pancrase: 2007 Neo-Blood Tournament Eliminations was an event held on March 25, 2007 at Korakuen Hall in Tokyo, Japan.

Results

Pancrase: Real 2007

Pancrase: Real 2007 was an event held on April 8, 2007 at Korakuen Hall in Tokyo, Japan.

Results

Pancrase: Rising 4

Pancrase: Rising 4 was an event held on April 27, 2007 at Korakuen Hall in Tokyo, Japan.

Results

Pancrase: 2007 Neo-Blood Tournament Semifinals

Pancrase: 2007 Neo-Blood Tournament Semifinals was an event held on May 6, 2007 at Korakuen Hall in Tokyo, Japan.

Results

Pancrase: Rising 5

Pancrase: Rising 5 was an event held on May 30, 2007 at Korakuen Hall in Tokyo, Japan.

Results

Pancrase: 2007 Neo-Blood Tournament Finals

Pancrase: 2007 Neo-Blood Tournament Finals was an event held on July 27, 2007 at Korakuen Hall in Tokyo, Japan.

Results

Pancrase: Rising 6

Pancrase: Rising 6 was an event held on September 5, 2007 at Korakuen Hall in Tokyo, Japan.

Results

Pancrase: Rising 7

Pancrase: Rising 7 was an event held on September 30, 2007 at Korakuen Hall in Tokyo, Japan.

Results

Pancrase: Rising 8

Pancrase: Rising 8 was an event held on October 14, 2007 at Korakuen Hall in Tokyo, Japan.

Results

Pancrase: Hybrid Bout in Utsunomiya 3

Pancrase: Hybrid Bout in Utsunomiya 3 was an event held on October 27, 2007 at Korakuen Hall in Tokyo, Japan.

Results

Pancrase: Rising 9

Pancrase: Rising 9 was an event held on November 28, 2007 at Korakuen Hall in Tokyo, Japan.

Results

Pancrase: 2007 Korea Neo-Blood Tournament

Pancrase: 2007 Korea Neo-Blood Tournament was an event held on December 16, 2007 at Korakuen Hall in Tokyo, Japan.

Results

Pancrase: Rising 10

Pancrase: Rising 10 was an event held on December 22, 2007 at Korakuen Hall in Tokyo, Japan.

Results

See also 
 Pancrase
 List of Pancrase champions
 List of Pancrase events

References

Pancrase events
2007 in mixed martial arts